Ideal Life (Chinese:理想人生)is the third self-created album by Lala Hsu, the pre-order of which started on 14 May 2012. The official release was on 6 June 2012, and the album included new songs and some songs published on streetvoice before. Lala Hsu was still in charge of the production, covering lyrics, music, creation and harmony. More importantly, the only producer invited was Chen Chien-Chi (陳建騏), who had been cooperating with Lala Hsu since her first album.
The preemption concert was held on 18 May 2012, and Lala Hsu's YouTube channel was founded at the same time.

Track listing 

 Notes
 "調色盤 (Palette)" is the soundtrack of the film Touch of the Light.
 "不怕慶祝 (Dare to Celebrate)" is the promotional song of the film Keep the Lights On in Taiwan.
 "布穀 (Cuckoo)" and "翻滾吧！我的寶貝 (Rolling! My Baby!)" are the theme songs of the short film The Girl Who Swims Breaststroke.

Music Videos

Awards 
24th Golden Melody Awards - 2013

Association of Music Workers in Taiwan (中華音樂人交流協會) - 2012

References

External links 
徐佳瑩官方專屬頻道(in Chinese)

2012 albums
Lala Hsu albums